The Assistant Secretary of the Navy (Manpower and Reserve Affairs) (abbreviated as ASN M&RA) is a civilian office in the United States Department of the Navy.  The Assistant Secretary of the Navy (Manpower and Reserve Affairs) reports to the Under Secretary of the Navy who in turn reports to the United States Secretary of the Navy.

The office of Assistant Secretary of the Navy (Manpower and Reserve Affairs) was created in 1968. The Assistant Secretary of the Navy (Manpower and Reserve Affairs) is responsible for recruiting all of the personnel of the United States Navy and the United States Marine Corps, including military personnel (both active and reserve), government civilians, contractors, and volunteers. Since 1993, the Assistant Secretary of the Navy (Manpower and Reserve Affairs) has been assisted by the Department of the Navy Force Management Oversight Council, an advisory council of senior military and civilian personnel in the Department of the Navy.

Organization of the Office of the Assistant Secretary of the Navy (Manpower and Reserve Affairs)

The principal deputies of the Assistant Secretary of the Navy (Manpower and Reserve Affairs) are:

 Deputy Assistant Secretary of the Navy (Total Force Transformation)
 Deputy Assistant Secretary of the Navy (Military Personnel Policy)
 Deputy Assistant Secretary of the Navy (Reserve Affairs)
 Deputy Assistant Secretary of the Navy (Civilian Human Resources)
 Assistant General Counsel of the Navy (Manpower and Reserve Affairs)

The Assistant Secretary of the Navy (Manpower and Reserve Affairs) oversees the following organizations:

 Secretary of the Navy Council of Review Boards
 Physical Evaluation Board
 Naval Discharge Review Board
 Naval Clemency and Parole Board
 Combat Related Special Compensation Board
 Navy Department Board of Decorations and Medals
 Board of Corrections of Naval Records

The principal military advisors of the Assistant Secretary of the Navy (Manpower and Reserve Affairs) are:

 Chief of Naval Personnel
 Chief of Naval Education and Training
 Chief of Navy Reserve
 Surgeon General of the United States Navy
 Deputy Commandant of the United States Marine Corps (Manpower and Reserve Affairs)

Assistant Secretaries

References

 Profile at Navy Department Library
 ASN M&RA Webpage

Office of the Secretary of the Navy